Hindsight is an album recorded by American saxophonist Ken McIntyre in 1974 for the SteepleChase label.

Reception

Allmusic awarded the album 4½ stars calling it a "well-rounded program" and stating "McIntyre is in consistently brilliant form".

Track listing
All compositions by Ken McIntyre except as indicated
 "Bootsie" - 7:10
 "Lush Life" (Billy Strayhorn) - 3:21
 "Mercedes" - 5:53 		
 "Body and Soul" (Frank Eyton, Johnny Green, Edward Heyman, Robert Sour) - 9:10 		
 "Airebil" - 8:05 		
 "Naima" (John Coltrane) - 4:55
 "'Round About Midnight" (Bernie Hanighen, Thelonious Monk, Cootie Williams) - 7:50 		
 "Sunnymoon for Two" (Sonny Rollins) - 4:46 		
 "Body and Soul" [Alternate Take] (Eyton, Green, Heyman, Sour) - 7:26 Bonus track on CD reissue

Personnel 
Ken McIntyre - alto saxophone (1, 5, 7 & 8), flute (3), bassoon (2), bass clarinet (4 & 9), oboe (6)
Kenny Drew - piano
Bo Stief - bass
Alex Riel - drums

References 

1974 albums
Makanda Ken McIntyre albums
SteepleChase Records albums